Leiarius longibarbis, commonly as Marbled Pim, is a species of demersal catfish of the family Pimelodidae that is native to Guyana and Brazil.

It inhabits Rio Orinoco in Colombia and Venezuela, Rio Essequibo in Guyana, and the Amazon basin in Brazil, Peru and Bolivia.

References

Pimelodidae
Catfish of South America
Fish described in 1855